George Gretton (b Norton in Hales 6 July 1754– d Hereford 29 July 1820) was an Anglican priest in the late 18th and early 19th centuries.

He was educated at Repton and Trinity College, Cambridge.
 He held livings at Townstal, Hedsor and Upton Bishop. He was Dean of Hereford from 1809 until his death.

Notes

1754 births
1820 deaths
Clergy from Shropshire
People educated at Repton School
Alumni of Trinity College, Cambridge
Church of England deans
Deans of Hereford